Ceres Transport, Incorporated (CTI) is a bus company under the umbrella of Yanson Group of Bus Companies (YGBC). It is based in Batangas City. It operates bus transport services in Batangas and Metro Manila, using the Strong Republic Nautical Highway.

History 
In 2007, Ceres Liner's Iloilo base pioneered travel between Iloilo City and Metro Manila through the Western Nautical Highway. Proving to be profitable, Yanson Group expanded its Metro Manila operations and established Ceres Transport in 2009, being based in Batangas City. It enabled bus services encompassing Cubao, Batangas City, Mindoro, Aklan, Antique and Iloilo.

In 2012, it bought out a franchise of Gold Star Bus Company and allowed it to operate its Batangas-Cubao and Batangas-Alabang routes. Later on, Yanson Group decided to create on its own subsidiary as Gold Star Bus Transport Incorporated, making it apart from the Ceres Transport Inc.

Branding 
Ceres Transport was once a brand under Vallacar Transit Incorporated. The "transport" branding once used to distinguish the Luzon-bound and those Ceres Liner buses at their former main base in Iloilo. Although Yanson Group had a practice to their bus branding such as "Liner" and "Tours" to differentiate their ordinary and air-conditioned buses, Ceres Transport does not have ordinary buses since it didn't click to Luzon market.

When Ceres Transport formed its own subsidiary and had its base in Batangas City, Yanson Group retained the Ceres Transport brand.

Base 
Their subsidiaries are sub-divided by bases. These are based on their area of their operation, and their base number shall be the prefix number for their bus fleets. Yanson Group started this practice in 2005 after they bought out Lilian Express Inc., and felt that re-organizing their company is needed.

There is only one base for Ceres Transport:

Bus routes 

 
 Batangas City - Cubao via EDSA or C-5 Road ACTEX (now under Gold Star)
 Batangas City - Alabang via Turbina or ACTEX (now under Gold Star)
 Batangas City - PITX/Buendia/Lawton via ACTEX
 Batangas City - PITX /SM Mall of Asia via ACTEX
 PITX - San Jose, Occidental Mindoro via Batangas City
 PITX - Iloilo City via Batangas City
 Pasay/Cubao - Iloilo City via Central Iloilo
 Pasay/Cubao - Iloilo City via Antique
 Pasay/Cubao - Sara via Alabang
 Pasay/Cubao - Estancia via Alabang
 Cubao - Kalibo via Central Iloilo
 Cubao - Bacolod via Iloilo City
 Cubao - Dumaguete via Bacolod and Kabankalan City via Iloilo City
 Pasay/Cubao - Dumaguete via Bacolod and Kabankalan City via Iloilo City.
 PITX - Zamboanga City via Dumaguete, Bacolod, Kabankalan City and Iloilo City.

Fleet 
Ceres Transport has several units from Chinese brand buses. Some of their fleets are also provided by their parent company's coach building division, Vallacar Transit Incorporated - Transport Engineering and Bus Body Assembly Plant (VTI-TEBBAP).
 Yanson ViKing
 Yanson Legacy
 Yutong ZK6127H
 King Long XMQ6126Y
 King Long XMQ6119T

See also 
 Ceres Liner
 Vallacar Transit (VTI)
 List of bus companies of the Philippines

References

External links
https://ygbc.com.ph/

Bus companies of the Philippines
Companies based in Batangas City